Agrioglypta is a genus of moths of the family Crambidae.

Species
Agrioglypta buxtoni (Tams, 1935)
Agrioglypta deliciosa Butler, 1887
Agrioglypta enneactis Meyrick, 1932
Agrioglypta eurytusalis (Walker, 1859)
Agrioglypta excelsalis (Walker, [1866])
Agrioglypta itysalis (Walker, 1859)
Agrioglypta juvenalis (Rebel, 1915)
Agrioglypta malayana (Butler, 1881)
Agrioglypta proximalis (Whalley, 1962)
Agrioglypta samoana (Swinhoe, 1906)
Agrioglypta zelimalis (Walker, 1859)

References

Spilomelinae
Crambidae genera
Taxa named by Edward Meyrick